The 1988–89 Southwest Indoor Soccer League season was an American indoor soccer season run by the Southwest Indoor Soccer League.

League standings

North Division

South Division

West Division

Playoffs

First round

Lubbock Lazers vs Albuquerque Gunners

Addison Arrows vs Oklahoma City Warriors

Houston Express vs San Antonio Heat

Semifinals
 The Lubbock Lazers defeated the Addison Arrows: 4-6, 8-6, 10-8, 4-10, 8-5
 The Austin Sockadillos defeated the Houston Express: 7-6(OT), 11-7, 12-9

Championship series

Honors
 Most Valuable Player:  Brian Monaghan, Austin Sockadillos
 Top Scorer:  Brian Monaghan, Austin Socadillos (71 goals)
 Assist Leader:  Uwe Balzis, Austin Sockadillos (28 assists)
 Top Goalkeeper:  David Swissler, Lubbock Lazers
 Rookie of the Year: Todd Hoodenpyle, Lubbock Lazers
 Coach of the Year:  António Simões, Austin Sockadillos

External links
The Year in American Soccer - 1989
 Lazers beat Sockadillos for SISL title Austin American-Statesman - Sunday, April 9, 1989

Southwest Indoor Soccer League, 1988-89
Southwest Indoor Soccer League, 1988-89
USISL indoor seasons